Since 1990 the Doak Walker Award honors the top running back in college football in the United States. It is named in honor of Doak Walker, a former running back who played for the SMU Mustangs from 1945 to 1949 and in the National Football League (NFL) for the Detroit Lions from 1950 to 1955. The player is selected by the award's National Selection Committee, which consists of notable sportswriters, television commentators, analysts, radio sports personalities and former All-America and NFL All-Pro football players.

To qualify for the award, the following criteria must be met:

 Candidate plays predominantly at the running back position and has made extraordinary contributions to his team.
 Candidate is enrolled in a degree program, is in good academic standing and is on schedule to graduate.
 Candidate holds a record of good citizenship within and beyond the athletic sphere.
 Candidate has demonstrated a record of leadership.
 Candidate exhibits the characteristics of sportsmanship and fair play associated with Doak Walker.

The award recipient receives a sculpture of Doak Walker, cast in bronze and mounted on a wooden base. It was created by artist Blair Buswell, who has sculpted the busts of more than a dozen inductees in the Pro Football Hall of Fame.

Notable Accomplishments
Wisconsin running backs won four times in eight years from 2012 to 2019. Wisconsin and Texas are tied with the most wins with 5 a piece.

Ricky Williams (Texas - 1997, 1998), Darren McFadden (Arkansas - 2006, 2007) and Jonathan Taylor (Wisconsin - 2018, 2019) are the only three players to win the award more than once.

Winners

References
General
 Doak Walker Award Winners. Sports-Reference.com. Retrieved December 13, 2016.
 College Football Awards - Doak Walker Award. ESPN.com. Retrieved December 13, 2016.
Footnotes

External links

College football national player awards
Awards established in 1990